Whites Creek is an unincorporated community located near Nashville in the northern part of Davidson County, Tennessee. The community and nearby creek which travels north to south along US 431 were named after an early settler named White who was killed by hostile American Indians prior to the settlement of Fort Nashboro in 1778. The Whites Creek area has its own US Post Office, with the ZIP Code 37189.

The historic Whites Creek District was established in 1780 and has some of the best preserved examples of the architectural and historical significance of this era in Middle Tennessee. It is now a part of Metro Nashville.

History

The legendary James Gang outlaws visited Whites Creek and rested there in the 1800s. Gang member Bill Ryan was arrested on March 25, 1881 in Whites Creek, prompting gang leaders Frank and Jesse James to leave the area.

Whites Creek Comprehensive High School is the community's only high school. The school is a part of the Metro Nashville Public Schools system.

Whites Creek Historic District was added to the National Register of Historic Places listings in Davidson County, Tennessee on July 18, 1980.

Fontanel, the former residence of Barbara Mandrell, is located in Whites Creek. The location was purchased by two investors and reopened to the public, featuring a restaurant, trails and an amphitheater. It recently added a bed & breakfast called The Inn at Fontanel, and a branch of Prichard's Distillery.

Notable residents
JJ Lawhorn – American Country Music Artist-Songwriter
 Frank Omiyale – NFL Offensive tackle
 Homer "Boots" Randolph – (1927 – 2007) Performed 1963 saxophone hit "Yakety Sax"
 John Rich – Country music star and co-founder of MuzikMafia
 Kid Rock (James Ritchie) - American singer,songwriter, rapper

References

Neighborhoods in Nashville, Tennessee
Populated places in Davidson County, Tennessee